Holiday in Dirt is an album by Stan Ridgway, released in 2002 through Ultramodern/New West Records. It is a collection of leftovers, rarities, compositions for film soundtracks. A quasi-cinematic project, the release of the Holiday in Dirt album was accompanied by a showing of 14 short films by various independent filmmakers, each film a visual interpretation of one of the songs on the album. A compilation DVD of the films, titled Holiday in Dirt: 14 Short Films of the Music of Stan Ridgway and produced by Minneapolis filmmakers Chris Strouth and Rick Fuller, was released in February 2005.

Track listing
All tracks composed by Stan Ridgway.

Credits
Stan Ridgway: Composer, guitar, harmonica, keyboards, liner notes, primary artist, producer, vocals
Ted Andersen: Drums
Baboo God: Engineer
Don Bell: Saxophone
Tchad Blake: Engineer
Bob DeMaa: Mastering
Mitchell Froom: Guest artist, organ, producer
Zander Schloss: Banjo, guitarron, slide guitar
Chris Strouth: Compilation producer
David Sutton: Bass guitar
Pietra Wexstun: Autoharp, keyboards, melodica, background vocals

References

2002 compilation albums
Stan Ridgway albums
Albums produced by Stan Ridgway